Renee Schulte (born December 9, 1970) is an American politician who is the Iowa State Representative for the 37th District. She has worked as an adjunct professor of psychology at Mount Mercy College in Cedar Rapids and as a family therapist at Four Oaks, a child welfare agency.

, Schulte serves on several committees in the Iowa House - the Appropriations, Education, Human Resources, and State Government committees.  She also serves as chair of the Administration and Rules Committee and as a member of the Child Welfare Advisory Committee and of the Council on Human Services. She has also been a licensed foster parent and worked as a family therapist for Four Oaks. She has been instrumental in the establishment of mental health care in the State of Iowa.  She is a member of the Professional Women's Network.

Early life
Schulte graduated from Danville High School in Danville, Illinois. She attended New Mexico State University in Las Cruces, New Mexico, where she earned her bachelor's degree in psychology and a master's degree in counseling and educational psychology. Renee and her husband Brent, disciple minister at Antioch Christian Church in Cedar Rapids, previously lived in New Mexico and Texas before moving to Iowa in 2001 to be closer to family.

Electoral history
Schulte narrowly won election to the Iowa House in 2008 defeating Democrat Art Staed, 8628 (49.95%)
to 8615 (49.88%). A recount resulted in a net gain of one vote for Staed, leaving the election with a 13-vote margin of victory.  Schulte won re-election in 2010, defeating Democratic opponent Mark Seidl.
*incumbent

Awards
Schulte has received the following honors and awards:
2011 Emerging Leader - State Legislative Leaders Foundation 
2011 Toll Fellowship 
Voice of Children Award - Orchard Place Board of Directors 
Iowa Farm Bureau "Friend of Agriculture"
Iowa Physician Assistant Society "Legislator of the Year"

References

External links

 Schulte on Project Vote Smart
 Schulte's legislative website
 Schulte's campaign website

1970 births
New Mexico State University alumni
Living people
Republican Party members of the Iowa House of Representatives
Women state legislators in Iowa
Mount Mercy University
21st-century American women